Somos familia is an Argentine telenovela produced and broadcast by Telefe in 2014. It stars Gustavo Bermúdez and Ana María Orozco.

Plot
The main characters are Joaquín (Gustavo Bermúdez), a famous businessman, owner of a motorcycle manufacturing plant, and Manuela (Ana María Orozco), his maid. After the death of his friend Sergio Miranda and his wife in an airplane crash, Joaquín became the legal guardian of Miranda's four orphans. One of these orphans is Pilar Miranda, who is really the daughter of Manuela. Manuela had gotten pregnant at the age of 15 and had to give up her newborn daughter for adoption; years later, she became a journalist and began searching for her child. Upon discovering that Pilar had been adopted by the Mirandas, she took a job as a maid in their home. Upon the Mirandas' deaths, she came along with the children to work for Joaquín. To avoid revealing her true identity, she works under the assumed name of "Ramona".

Premise
Somos familia is a traditional telenovela aimed at all age groups. The plot has similarities with Grande, pá!, one of Telefe's successful telenovelas of the 1990s. Bermúdez plays a traditional telenovela gentleman, seducing the female spectators with romance rather than physical appearance. Although the program is mainly a drama, it includes some comedy scenes, most of them played by actor Fabián Vena. Vena plays a Bon Vivant, similar to the Argentine comic book character Isidoro Cañones.

Production
Somos familia is produced by Quique Estevanez, who previously produced the successful telenovela Dulce amor, also aired by Telefe. It is written by Marcelo Nacci and Laura Barneix. The closing credits of the first episodes did not mention Nacci and Barneix, which sparked criticism from author unions such as Argentores and the Asociación de Autores Audiovisuales. Argentores even sent a legal document requiring the correction of the closing credits. As the problem continued, Argentores sent two more legal documents on February 6.

The theme song, "Somos familia", was composed by Argentine artist Thian, who writes theme songs for TV programs, and performed by Spanish artist Álex Ubago. The song was produced in Spain in June 2013 by Rubén Caballero. The song also features Ricardo Urbina on drums, Joseba San Sebastián on bass, Rubén Caballero on guitar, Txus Aranburu on keyboard, and Laura Latienda in the chorus. The program was first aired during Ubago's 2014 tour in Argentina.

Reception
The program, which had been awaited for months, was aired when the telenovela Solamente Vos at Channel 13 was nearing its end. Somos familia garnered a higher rating.

Cast
 Gustavo Bermúdez as Joaquín Navarro
 Ana María Orozco as Manuela Paz/Ramona
 Betina O'Connell as Irene Lamas
 Tomás Fonzi as Pedro Mancini
 Pablo Alarcón as Gregorio Paz
 Mónica Cabrera as Ramona Isarrualde
 Martín Campilongo as Armando Flores
 Eva De Dominici as Pilar Miranda/Pilar González Ferri Paz
 Nicolás Furtado as Máximo Morales
 Augusto Schuster as Juan Inacio Miranda 
 Silvina Bosco as Margarita Miranda
 Mimí Ardú as Elsa
 Luciana González Costa as Lola
 Ivo Cutzarida as Fabian Galván Ep:(55-97)
 Fabián Vena as Pablo Navarro
 Natalia Lobo as Flavia Carlucci
 Maxi Ghione as Francisco Morales
 Graciela Pal  as Azucena Lobos
 Nora Cárpena as Beatriz Blasco
 Maite Lanata as Malena Miranda
 Fabián Mazzei as Andrés Saldivar
 Paula Morales as Julieta Paz
 Bárbara Vélez as Olivia Navarro
 Gabriela Sari as Agustina Graciani
 Micaela Wasserman as Delfina Miranda
 Olivia Viggiano as Camila Galván
 Gabo Correa as Sergio Miranda
 Jorge Noya as Marito
 Hernán Jimenez as Alexis
 Sabrina Rojas as Julia
 Franco Pucci as Junior Navarro
 Justina Bustos as Soledad Varela
 Stefano De Gregorio as Miguel
 Guido Pennelli as Gasparini Ep:(1-42)
 Adriana Salonia as Mabel Gonzáles Ep:(24-)
 Fabio Di Tomaso as Germán Colombo Ep:(37-74)
 Florencia Ortiz as Benigna Miranda Ep:(66-118)
 Valentín Villafañe as Tomás  Ep:(75-)

References

External links
 Official site 
 

2014 telenovelas
Argentine telenovelas
Telefe telenovelas
2014 Argentine television series debuts
2014 Argentine television series endings
Spanish-language telenovelas